In enzymology, a glutathione—CoA-glutathione transhydrogenase is an enzyme that catalyzes the chemical reaction

CoA + glutathione disulfide  CoA-glutathione + glutathione

Thus, the two substrates of this enzyme are CoA and glutathione disulfide, whereas its two products are CoA-glutathione and glutathione.

This enzyme belongs to the family of oxidoreductases, specifically those acting on a sulfur group of donors with a disulfide as acceptor.  The systematic name of this enzyme class is CoA:glutathione-disulfide oxidoreductase. Other names in common use include glutathione-coenzyme A glutathione disulfide transhydrogenase, glutathione-coenzyme A glutathione disulfide transhydrogenase, glutathione coenzyme A-glutathione transhydrogenase, glutathione:coenzyme A-glutathione transhydrogenase, coenzyme A:oxidized-glutathione oxidoreductase, and coenzyme A:glutathione-disulfide oxidoreductase.  This enzyme participates in cysteine metabolism and glutathione metabolism.

References

 

EC 1.8.4
Enzymes of unknown structure